Sergei Mikhailovich Rytov (3 July 1908 – 22 October 1996) was a Soviet physicist and member of the Russian Academy of Sciences. He worked at the Gorkiĭ Research Institute for Engineering Physics, the Lebedev Physical Institute, and the Mints Institute of Radio Engineering. Rytov contributed to the fields of statistical radiophysics, near-field radiative heat transfer, wave propagation, acoustics, and oscillation theory. The Rytov number and Rytov approximation bear his name.

References 

Soviet physicists
1908 births
1996 deaths